The 2019–20 NCAA Division I women's ice hockey season is the 19th season of competition in the National Collegiate division of NCAA women's ice hockey, the de facto equivalent of Division I in that sport. The season began in September 2019 and ended on March 10, 2020 following the conclusion of the ECAC Championship. The 2020 NCAA Division I women's ice hockey tournament at Agganis Arena in Boston which was supposed to be held March 20 and 22 was cancelled due to the COVID-19 pandemic.

Changes from 2018–19
The most significant change from the 2018–19 season was the recognition of the New England Women's Hockey Alliance (NEWHA) as an official NCAA conference. The NEWHA was founded in 2017 as a scheduling alliance by the six schools that then competed as National Collegiate independents—full Division I members Holy Cross and Sacred Heart, plus Division II members Franklin Pierce, Post, Saint Anselm, and Saint Michael's. Holy Cross left after the first NEWHA season of 2017–18 to join Hockey East. Shortly before the 2018–19 season, the remaining five members formally organized as a conference and began the process of gaining full NCAA recognition.

In the meantime, LIU Brooklyn had announced that it would add women's ice hockey effective in 2019–20, and would join the NEWHA at that time. Shortly after this announcement, the school's parent institution, Long Island University, announced that it would merge the athletic programs of its two main campuses (Division I Brooklyn and Division II Post) into a single Division I program that would later be unveiled as the LIU Sharks.

With the conference membership returning to six for 2019–20, the NCAA officially approved the NEWHA as a Division I conference shortly before the start of that season. This action also meant that there would be no independent programs in that season, since the NEWHA membership included all of the previous National Collegiate independents.

Polls

Regular season

Standings

Player stats

Scoring leaders
The following players lead the NCAA in points at the conclusion of games played on November 11, 2019.

Leading goaltenders
The following goaltenders lead the NCAA in goals against average.

GP = Games played; Min = Minutes played; W = Wins; L = Losses; T = Ties; GA = Goals against; SO = Shutouts; SV% = Save percentage; GAA = Goals against average

Awards and honors
Elizabeth Giguere, Clarkson, Patty Kazmaier Award
Doug Derraugh, Cornell, AHCA Coach of the Year

All-America honors
Aerin Frankel, Northeastern, First Team All-American 
Jaime Bourbonnais, Cornell, CCM Hockey Women's Division I All-American: First Team
Lindsay Browning, Cornell, CCM Hockey Women's Division I All-American: Second Team

All-USCHO honors
Sarah Fillier, Princeton, All-USCHO National Honors
Carly Bullock, Princeton, All-USCHO National Honors

CHA Awards
Emma Nuutinen, Senior, Forward, Mercyhurst, Player of the Year
 
Mae Batherson, Forward, Syracuse, Rookie of the Year
 
Mike Sisti, Mercyhurst, Coach of the Year

Lindsay Eastwood, Senior, Syracuse, Best Defenseman

Alexa Vasko, Junior, Mercyhurst, Best Defensive Forward

Abby Moloughney, Sophomore, Forward, Syracuse, Individual Sportsmanship Award

Syracuse, Team Sportsmanship Award

Kennedy Blair, Goaltender, Mercyhurst, CHA Tournament MVP

All-Conference First Team
Forward – Jaycee Gebhard, Senior, Robert Morris
Forward – Emma Nuutinen, Senior, Mercyhurst
Forward – Abby Moloughney, Sophomore, Robert Morris
Forward – Michele Robillard, Senior, Mercyhurst
Defense – Lindsay Eastwood, Senior, Syracuse
Defense – Emily Curlett, Junior, Robert Morris
Goalie – Chantal Burke, Junior, Penn State

All-Conference Second Team
 
Forward – Maggie Knott, Senior, Mercyhurst
Forward – Lexi Templeman, Junior, Robert Morris
Forward – Savannah Rennie, Senior, Syracuse
Defense – Izzy Heminger, Sophomore, Penn State
Defense – Sam Isbell, Senior, Mercyhurst
Goalie – Terra Lanteigne, Senior, RIT

All-Rookie Team

Forward – Madison Beishuizen, Syracuse
Forward – Jaymee Nolan, RIT
Forward – Maggy Burbidge, Robert Morris
Defense – Mae Batherson, Syracuse
Defense – Mallory Uihlein, Penn State
Goalie – Raygan Kirk, Robert Morris

ECAC Awards
Elizabeth Giguere, ECAC Hockey Player of the Year
Elizabeth Giguere, ECAC Hockey Best Forward
Dave Flint, ECAC Hockey Coach of the Year

ECAC All-Stars
First Team All-ECAC
Elizabeth Giguere, 2019-20 ECAC Hockey First Team All-League

Ivy League Awards
Lindsay Browning, Cornell, Ivy League Player of the Year
Izzy Daniel, Cornell, Ivy League Rookie of the Year

All-Ivy honorees
First Team All-Ivy
Sarah Fillier, Princeton  
Carly Bullock, Princeton 
Kristin O'Neill, Cornell  
Micah Zandee-Hart, Cornell 
Jaime Bourbonnais, Cornell 
Lindsay Browning, Cornell 
Second Team All-Ivy
Maggie Connors, F, Princeton 
Maddie Mills, F, Cornell
Dominique Petrie, F, Harvard
Emma Seitz, D, Yale
Claire Thompson, D, Princeton
Rachel McQuigge, G, Princeton
Honorable Mention All-Ivy
Claire Dalton, F, Yale 
Kristin Della Rovere, F, Harvard
Lotti Odnoga, D, Dartmouth
Ali Peper, D, Harvard 
Becky Dutton, G, Harvard

HCA Awards
Aerin Frankel, Hockey Commissioners Association Women's Goaltender of the Month (November 2019)

Katy Knoll, Women’s Hockey Commissioners’ Association National Rookie of the Month, November 2019

Corinne Schroeder, Hockey Commissioners Association Women’s Goaltender of the Month (December 2019) 

Ida Kuoppala, Maine, Women's Hockey Commissioners Association Rookie of the Month (February 2020)

Carly Bullock, Princeton, Women's Hockey Commissioners Association Player of the Month February 2020

Ava Boutilier, New Hampshire, Women's Hockey Commissioners Association Goaltender of the Month February 2020

References

2019–20 NCAA Division I women's hockey season
NCAA
NCAA Division I women's ice hockey seasons